David Arnold Croll,  (born Davud Avrum Croll; March 12, 1900 – June 11, 1991) was a Canadian politician. He served as the mayor of Windsor, Ontario twice. He entered provincial politics in the 1930s, and served as minister of public works and municipal affairs in the Mitch Hepburn government. He won election to the House of Commons of Canada in 1945. In 1955 he was appointed to the Senate of Canada, becoming the first Jewish Senator. He served as a senator until his death, on June 11, 1991, a few hours after what would be his last senate sitting.

Early life
Croll was born in Moscow, Russia and was brought to Canada with his family as a young boy, at which point his name was anglicized. Croll became a lawyer and entered politics serving as mayor of Windsor, Ontario from 1931 to 1934 during the worst days of the Great Depression. He made his reputation as a social reformer when he insisted the city go into deficit in order to provide relief programs for the unemployed and destitute.

Provincial politics
Croll won a seat in the Legislative Assembly of Ontario as a Liberal Member of the Legislative Assembly (MLA) for Windsor—Walkerville in the 1934 election that brought the Liberals to power under the leadership of Mitchell Hepburn. Croll became Canada's first Jewish cabinet minister when he became Minister of Public Welfare. He later also added the portfolios of Minister of Municipal Affairs and Minister of Labour. He and Attorney-General Arthur Roebuck broke with Hepburn over the Premier's opposition to the United Auto Workers strike against General Motors in Oshawa in 1937, and resigned from cabinet saying "I would rather walk with the workers than ride with General Motors."  He remained a provincial Liberal backbencher until 1943, as well as serving again as Mayor of Windsor.

Military service
He served in the Canadian Army during the Second World War, enlisting as a Private in the Essex Scottish Regiment and rising in rank to lieutenant-colonel.

Federal politics
He was recruited by the Liberal Party of Canada to contest the Toronto riding of Spadina in the 1945 federal election. The Liberals feared that Tim Buck, leader of the communist Labor-Progressive Party was poised to win the riding. The popular Croll was seen as the only Liberal who could defeat him. After Croll was nominated, Buck instead ran in a neighbouring riding, leaving Sam Carr to be the LPP's candidate. Croll handily won a seat in the House of Commons of Canada, becoming Spadina's Member of Parliament (MP) and Tory Toronto's sole Liberal MP. He was re-elected in the 1949 and 1953 elections.

Despite being regarded as one of the most talented Liberal MPs and, until 1950, the only Liberal MP from Toronto, Croll was never summoned to the Canadian Cabinet where he would have become the first Jewish federal cabinet minister. Instead, he was appointed to the Senate of Canada in 1955, becoming Canada's first Jewish senator.

Croll was the author of the influential 1971 "Report of the Special Senate Committee on Poverty" which began with the words "the poor do not choose poverty. It is at once their affliction and our national shame. The children of the poor (and there are many) are the most helpless victims of all, and find even less hope in a society where welfare systems from the very beginning destroys their chances of a better life." The report moved the Trudeau government to triple family allowances in 1973 and institute the Child Tax Credit in 1978. Aside from his work on poverty, he was also responsible for Senate reports on aging. In 1990 in recognition of his contributions, he was sworn into the Queen's Privy Council for Canada, an honour usually given only to federal cabinet ministers.

He remained an active senator until his death, even taking his seat in the "Red Chamber" a few hours before his death. He died of heart failure in the Château Laurier Hotel, a few hours after attending an afternoon senate session on June 11, 1991. At the time, he was the oldest serving senator, as he was appointed at a time when appointments to the senate were for life.

In his honour, the Senator David A. Croll Apartments, a seniors' residence in Toronto was named after him. The irony is that the building was originally the focus of Toronto's late 1960s youth counterculture, infamous Rochdale College, built by Campus Co-operative Student Residences (Campus Co-op) in 1968 as a student co-operative residence. The building was selected, as a pilot project, for installing Canada's first rooftop combined heat and power system.

Archives 
There is a David Arnold Croll fonds at Library and Archives Canada.

References

External links 
 
 

 Croll at Canadian Encyclopedia

1900 births
1991 deaths
Lawyers in Ontario
Canadian people of Russian-Jewish descent
Canadian King's Counsel
Canadian senators from Ontario
Liberal Party of Canada MPs
Ontario Liberal Party MPPs
Liberal Party of Canada senators
Mayors of Windsor, Ontario
Members of the House of Commons of Canada from Ontario
Members of the King's Privy Council for Canada
Members of the Executive Council of Ontario
People from Mogilev
20th-century Canadian lawyers
Jewish mayors of places in Canada
Canadian Army personnel of World War II
Canadian Army officers
White Russian emigrants to Canada
Essex Scottish Regiment officers
Essex Scottish Regiment soldiers